Aborolabis pervicina is a species of earwig in the genus Aborolabis, the family Anisolabididae, the suborder Forficulina, and the order Dermaptera. Found primarily in the Indomalayan realm, this species was first classified by Burr in 1913.

References 

Fauna of Southeast Asia
Anisolabididae
Insects described in 1913